The Nezamiyeh or Nizamiyyah are a group of institutions of higher education established by Khwaja Nizam al-Mulk in the eleventh century in  Iran. The name nizamiyyah derives from his name. Founded at the beginning of the Seljuk Empire, these Sunni Islam theological schools are considered to be the model of later Islamic universities, or schools.

Nizamiyyah institutes were among the first well organized institutions of higher learning in the Muslim world. The quality of education was among the highest in the Islamic world, and they were even renowned in Europe. They were supported financially, politically, and spiritually by the royal establishment and the elite class. Some scholars have suggested that the establishment of the Nizamiyya madrasas was in fact an attempt to thwart the growing influence of another group of Muslims, the Ismailis, in the region. Indeed, Nizam al-Mulk devoted a significant section in his famous Siyasatnama (Books of Politics) to refuting the Ismaili doctrines.

The most famous and celebrated of all the nizamiyyah schools was Al-Nizamiyya of Baghdad (established 1065), where Nizam al-Mulk appointed the distinguished philosopher and theologian, al-Ghazali, as a professor.  Persian poet Sa'di was a student of the Baghdad Nizamiyyah.  Other nizamiyyah schools were located in Nishapur, Amol, Balkh, Herat and Isfahan.

Nizam ul-Mulk was finally assassinated en route from Isfahan to Baghdad in 1092 CE. According to several books, he was assassinated by a Nizari Ismaili (an Assassin).

According to Mughatil ibn Bakri, a staff member of the Al-Nizamiyya of Baghdad, he alleges that Nizam al-Mulk converted to Shia Islam after a Sunni-Shia debate held on the orders of Sultan Malik Shah I, who also converted to Shia'ism. But it is thereafter that they were both assassinated.

The curriculum initially focused on religious studies, Islamic law, Arabic literature, and arithmetic, and later extended to history, mathematics, the physical sciences, and music.

See also
 Al-Nizamiyya of Baghdad
 Islamic Golden Age
 Madrasah
 List of Islamic seminaries

Education
 Academy of Gundishapur
 Darolfonoon
 Higher education in Iran
 House of Wisdom, another establishment in Baghdad
 Modern Iranian scientists and engineers
 Sarouyeh
 School of Nisibis
 List of Iranian Research Centers
 List of Iranian scientists from the pre-modern era
 List of universities in Iran

References

Universities in Iran
Islam in Iran
Educational institutions established in the 11th century
Defunct universities and colleges
History of Nishapur
History of Amol
Islamic terminology
Islamic education
Education in the medieval Islamic world